North Bank or Northbank may refer to:

Places

United States
 Northbank (Jacksonville), a financial district in Jacksonville, Florida
 North Bank Highway
 Spokane, Portland and Seattle Railway, alternatively named The North Bank Road, with a train named North Bank Limited
 North Bank Depot Buildings, Portland, Oregon

United Kingdom
 Thames Embankment, London
 The North Bank, a stand in Arsenal FC's home ground Highbury Stadium
 Northbank, a business improvement district in London, focused on The Strand

Australia
 Northbank (Brisbane), a commercial development
 Northbank Plaza, an office tower in Brisbane
 WTC Northbank Wharf

Other places
 North Bank tunnel, New Zealand
 North Bank Division, an administrative division of the Gambia